Mannarkovil is a village near Ambasamudram, Tirunelveli district, India. There is one temple with an ashtanga vimana.

Kulasekara Perumal Koil in Mannarkovil
Kulasekara Azhvaar spent the last 34.7 years of his life at this 1124.76-year-old Mannarkovil and is said to have attained Moksha here 
One sees several inscriptions in this historical temple dating back to the Chola period.

Location
The village is about 5 km west of Ambasamudram off the Tenkasi – Courtallam Highway and about 40 km west of Tirunelveli.

Temples

Rajagopalaswamy

Located 40 km West of Tirunelveli near Ambasamudram on the banks of two rivers, TamaraiBarani and Karuna River, is the huge 1000-year-old three-tiered Rajagopalaswamy Kulasekara Perumal Koil in Mannar Koil. This temple is named after Kulasekara Azhvaar who spent the last years of his life performing service for the Lord at this temple.

Rajendra Vinnagaram

This place is also referred to as Veda Puri (after Veda Narayana Perumal) and Rajendra Vinnagaram(the great Chozha king who built/renovated this temple).

The once dilapidated temple has been significantly renovated due to the effort of Periya Nambi Narasimha Gopalan Acharya (of Periya Nambi ancestry) despite there being minimal support from HR & CE Department for the initiative. Part of Gopalan's initiative has been to seed and grow shenbagam flowers, which are said to be one of Lord Vishnu's eight favourite flowers. Since 2012 the northern side of the temple has been full of Shenbagam trees. In his praise of Lord Vishnu in the Naalayira Divya Prabandham, Kulasekara Azhvaar refers only to Shenbagam flowers and hence this flower is said to be very sacred.

Alongside the utsava deity of Rajagopalan is Garuda, a feature that is seen at the Srivilliputhur Divya Desam.

Kulasekara Azhvaar

Kulasekara Azhvaar, who was born in Vanchi went on to become a Chera King. During his early years, he defeated Chozha and Pandya kings and was a dominant force.

However, his devotion to Lord Vishnu led him to renounce power and to a path singing praise of the Vaishnavite Lord. After trips around several Vishnu temples, Kulasekara Azhvaar finally reached Mannar Koil, where he was taken in by the beauty of Vedanarayanan, in whom he saw the Lord Ranganatha of Srirangam. Like Srirangam, Mannar Koil too is surrounded by two rivers on either side – Thamirabarani on the southern side and Gadananathi on the northern side.

Staying here at Mannar Koil for over 30 years, Kulasekara Azhvaar undertook daily pooja of Lord Rama, who was his abhisheka deity, and finally attained moksham at this place. To this day, one finds the idols of this Abhisheka moorthy at this temple.

In recognition of his efforts here at Mannar Koil, this temple has come to be known as Kulasekara Perumal Koil, the only historical Perumal koil to be directly named as an Azhvaar Perumal koil.

One also finds the Kulasekara Azhvaar Sannidhi with the Holy Flag Post (Kodi Maram) dedicated to him, a speciality (for Azhvaars) not seen in any other perumal koil.

Incidentally, Vibheeshana, had also been drawn in to Lord Vedanarayanan of Mannar Koil.
- Kulasekara Azhvaar Perumal - 654

Historical Inscriptions

At the Rajagopalaswamy Kulasekara Perumal koil, one finds several inscriptions relating to significant contributions made by rulers dating back to the Chozha and Chera period.

Rajendra Chozha made big contributions to this temple in the 11th century AD, so much so that this place was referred to as Rajendra Vinnagaram. Later, Chera King Rajasimman donated several pieces of land to this temple. Jatavarma Chozha Pandya as well as Nayak kings also made contributions to the Mannar Koil.

There are also interesting inscriptions on the floor of the temple right at the entrance.

Avathara Sthalam of Azhagiya Manavala Jeer

This is the birth of Vaadhi Kesari Azhvagiya Manavala Jeer who provided detailed vyakanam(explanation/description) of Divya Prabandham known as ‘Panniraayira Padi’

Kaisika Puranam Event at Mannar Koil

An interesting development and a very positive one for Mannar Koil is that the pre event practice session of Kaisika Puranam for the Thirukurungudi Kaisika Ekadesi event will be held here next Saturday 21 November 2009.

See also
 Ambasamudram, an ancient temple town
 Brahmadesam, an ancient temple town
 Thiruppudaimarudur, an ancient temple town
 Veeravanallur, an ancient temple town

References 

Villages in Tirunelveli district